Jet Express was an airline based in Libreville, Gabon. It operated a domestic schedule linking the major towns of Gabon with regional services to neighbouring countries in West Africa. Its main base was Libreville International Airport and in 2007 became O. R. Tambo International Airport.

According to the website ch-aviation the company is out of business.

History
The airline was established in 1989 as Avirex Gabon and is owned by Philippe Salles (98%), its President and CEO. In 2007, the airline was renamed "Jet Express" operated mostly charters and wet and dry leases aircraft to airlines from Johannesburg.

Destinations
Jet Express operates the following services (in March 2008):

Domestic scheduled destinations: Libreville and Port-Gentil.

Fleet
The Jet Express fleet consists of the following aircraft (as of 15 November 2009) :

2 Boeing 737-200
1 McDonnell Douglas MD-87

References 

Defunct airlines of Gabon
Airlines established in 1994
Companies based in Libreville
Gabonese companies established in 1994